Agylla septentrionalis is a moth of the family Erebidae. It was described by William Barnes and James Halliday McDunnough in 1911. It is found in North America, including Arizona and South Carolina.

The wingspan is about 37 mm.

References

Moths described in 1911
septentrionalis
Moths of North America